Cleiton Januário Franco or simply Cleiton Kanu (born 17 May 1985 in São Paulo) is a Brazilian forward. He currently is free agent.

Career 
Cleiton made his professional debut for Engenheiro Beltrão in the Campeonato Paranaense. After, he played for Real Brasil C.F. from Curitiba.

On 12 January 2010 Kanu transferred to Volyn Lutsk.

Honours
 Volyn Lutsk
2 place in the Ukrainian First League: 2010

References

External links
websoccerclub.com
 

1985 births
Living people
Brazilian footballers
Brazilian expatriate footballers
Expatriate footballers in Ukraine
Expatriate footballers in Morocco
Expatriate footballers in Vietnam
FC Volyn Lutsk players
Maghreb de Fès players
Association football forwards
Footballers from São Paulo